Nikhil Bernard (born 30 December 1989) is an Indian professional footballer who last played as a goalkeeper for Chennaiyin FC in the Indian Super League.

Career

Royal Wahingdoh
Born in Bangalore, Karnataka, Bernard started his career with Royal Wahingdoh F.C. of the Shillong Premier League and I-League 2nd Division. In 2014, he helped Wahingdoh to promotion to the I-League.

He made his professional debut for the side on 28 December 2014 in the Federation Cup against Mumbai.

Bengaluru FC
On 2 February 2016, he signed for the home town club Bengaluru FC.

Ozone FC
After brief stint with Bengaluru FC, Bernard joined newly formed Bengaluru based I-League 2nd division club, Ozone FC.

Career statistics

References

1989 births
Living people
Footballers from Bangalore
Indian footballers
Royal Wahingdoh FC players
Bengaluru FC players
Association football goalkeepers
I-League 2nd Division players
I-League players
Ozone FC players
Gokulam Kerala FC players
Indian Super League players
Chennaiyin FC players